Chanute Peak is a peak in Korten Ridge on the east side of Lanchester Bay,  south of Wennersgaard Point, Davis Coast in Graham Land. It was named by the UK Antarctic Place-Names Committee for Octave Chanute, an American designer of gliders who first introduced moveable planes for the purpose of control and stability in 1896–97.

Map
 Trinity Peninsula. Scale 1:250000 topographic map No. 5697. Institut für Angewandte Geodäsie and British Antarctic Survey, 1996.

References 

 SCAR Composite Antarctic Gazetteer.

Mountains of Graham Land
Davis Coast